The Anji Bridge is the world's oldest open-spandrel segmental arch bridge of stone construction. Credited to the design of a craftsman named Li Chun, the bridge was constructed in the years 595–605 during the Sui dynasty (581–618). Located in the southern part of Hebei Province, it is the oldest standing bridge in China. It is considered one of the Four Treasures of Hebei.

Name and location 
The bridge is also commonly known as the Zhaozhou Bridge, after Zhao County, which was formerly known as Zhaozhou. Another name for the bridge is the Great Stone Bridge. It is a pedestrian bridge and is currently open to the public.
In English literature, it is also referred as Chiao Shui Bridge, after the river it crosses.

History
Starting from 581 CE, the Sui dynasty reasserted imperial control over the competing powers that had ruled various regions of China since the decline of the Han dynasty in the third century. Thus immense public works projects were carried out, including the rebuilding of two grand imperial capitals, the excavation of the 2400-kilometer-long Grand Canal, and major improvements to the fortifications that predated the Great Wall. Economically, the long-distance transport of goods and men was a critical component to the interests and sustainability of the ruling house. The movement of goods by land south and southwest from the North China Plain to the Central Plains around Kaifeng and Luoyang followed a path that crossed the Xiao River near Luanzhou (later Zhaozhou and now Zhaoxian) in today's Hebei province. Flowing west to east through a plain that was relatively low-lying on both sides, the Xiao River was an important artery for transporting goods, but an impediment to continuous overland movement and the economic integration of China's regions.

It was under these circumstances that Li Chun, who directed masons and other craftsmen, built the Anji (Safe Passage) Bridge, also called Dashi (Great Stone) Bridge. Although Chinese history credits Li Chun with the design and building of the Anji Bridge, no contemporaneous materials recorded the process, however later chronicles do make notes of it in brief.

Among the most remarkable achievements of Chinese bridge building—indeed an advancement unrivaled in the world—was the creation of this segmental arch bridge of wholly stone construction. This innovation, which occurred between the end of the sixth century and beginning of the seventh century, repudiated conventional wisdom that a semicircular arch was necessary to transfer the weight of a bridge downwards to where the arch tangentially meets the pier. The double pair of openings piercing both ends of the arch spandrel, which as well as accentuating its lithe curvature, lightens the weight of the bridge and facilitates the diversion of flood waters by allowing them to pass through the auxiliary arches rather than pound against the spandrels. The Zhaozhou Bridge is celebrated as China's oldest standing bridge and the oldest open spandrel stone bridge in the world.

Construction 

This is considerably smaller than the rise-to-span ratio of 0.5 of a semicircular arch bridge and slightly smaller than the rise-to-span ratio of 0.207 of a quarter circle. The arch length to span ratio is 1.1, less than the arch-to-span ratio of 1.57 of a semicircle arch bridge by 43%, thus the saving in material is about 40%, making the bridge lighter in weight. The elevation of the arch is about 45°, which subjects the abutments of the bridge to downward force and sideways force. This bridge was built in 605.

The central arch is made of 28 thin, curved limestone slabs which are joined with iron butterfly joints.  This allows the arch to adjust to shifts in its supports and prevents the bridge from collapsing even when a segment of the arch breaks.  The bridge has two small side arches on either side of the main arch.  These side arches serve two important functions: first, they reduce the total weight of the bridge by about 15.3% or approximately 700 tons, which is vital because of the low rise-to-span ratio and the large forces on the abutments it creates.  Second, when the bridge is submerged during a flood, they allow water to pass through, thereby reducing the forces on the structure of the bridge.

Li Chun's innovative spandrel-arch construction, while economising in materials, was also of considerable aesthetic merit.  An inscription left on the bridge by Tang dynasty officials seventy years after its construction reads:

Later history and reputation 

During the next 1,400 years, the bridge survived at least eight wars, ten major floods and numerous earthquakes, the most recent being the 7.2-magnitude Xingtai earthquake in 1966.  Yet, the support structure remains intact and the bridge is still in use.  Only the ornamental railings have been replaced every few hundred years.

The Anji bridge influenced the design of later Chinese bridge structures, such as the similar Yongtong Bridge near Zhaoxian in Hebei. The Yongtong Bridge is a 26 m (85 ft) long stone segmental-arch bridge built in 1130 by the Song structural engineer Pou Qianer.
 
The intriguing design of the Anji bridge has given rise to many legends.  According to one legend, the bridge was built by a master architect of the mid-1st millennium BC named Lu Ban in a single night.  In another story the bridge was put to the test by two immortals who crossed it at the same time, and Lu Ban saved it by wading into the water and supporting the structure.
 
Although Ming dynasty (1368–1644) authors compared the bridge to "a new moon rising above the clouds" and "a long rainbow hanging on a mountain waterfall", it later fell into obscurity.  When Professor Liang Sicheng of Tsinghua University rediscovered the bridge on a field exploration of ancient architecture in Hebei province, he made detailed measurements and published a report and drawing, after which the bridge became world-famous.

Anji bridge was dedicated as an International Historic Civil Engineering Landmark by the American Society of Civil Engineers in 1991. In 1996, the Chinese authorities nominated it for inclusion in the World Heritage List as having "a very important place in the world bridge building history".

See also
 Guyue Bridge, a stone arch bridge completed in 1213, in Zhejiang.
 List of bridges in China

References

External links 

 Zhaozhou Bridge American Society of Civil Engineers: History and Heritage of Civil Engineering
 Asian Research
 Chinaculture.org Site sponsored by the Ministry of Culture of the People's Republic of China

Deck arch bridges
Bridges completed in the 7th century
Bridges in Hebei
Arch bridges in China
Buildings and structures in Shijiazhuang
Sui dynasty
Chinese architectural history
Transport in Hebei
Major National Historical and Cultural Sites in Hebei
Historic Civil Engineering Landmarks
Stone bridges in China
7th-century establishments in China